The Minister for Aboriginal Affairs is a position in the Cabinet of Western Australia, first created in 1947 during the McLarty–Watts Ministry.

The current Minister for Aboriginal Affairs is Tony Buti of the Labor Party. The minister is responsible for the state government's Department of Aboriginal Affairs (DAA), which exists "to facilitate the development of policy and programs which deliver sustainable economic, environmental and social benefits to Aboriginal communities".

List of Ministers for Aboriginal Affairs
Twenty one people have been appointed as Minister for Aboriginal Affairs in Western Australia, with Edgar Lewis's 8 years and 325 days during the Brand–Nalder Ministry the longest period in the position. The position and corresponding department have existed under several different names, including Native Affairs (4 years), Native Welfare (19 years), Aboriginal Affairs (23 years), and Indigenous Affairs (12 years). The current name was adopted after requests from representatives of Western Australia's Aboriginal communities.

In the table below, members of the Legislative Council are designated "MLC". All others were members of the Legislative Assembly at the time of their service. In Western Australia, serving ministers are entitled to be styled "The Honourable", and may retain the style after three years' service in the ministry.

See also
 Minister for Aboriginal Affairs (New South Wales)
 Minister for Aboriginal Affairs (Victoria)
 Minister for Indigenous Affairs (Australia)

References

Aboriginal affairs
Ministers, Aboriginal affairs
Western Australia
Department of Aboriginal Affairs (Western Australia)